Calyptrosciadium bungei is a species of flowering plant in the family Apiaceae, native to Afghanistan and Iran. It was first described by Pierre Edmond Boissier  in 1888 as Prangos bungei.

References

Apioideae
Flora of Afghanistan
Flora of Iran
Plants described in 1888